Luddenham is a suburb of Sydney, in the state of New South Wales, Australia 42 kilometres west of the Sydney central business district, in the local government areas of the City of Penrith and City of Liverpool. It is part of the Greater Western Sydney region.

History
His elder brother was the more famous Gregory Blaxland and Luddenham was the name of their family property in Kent, England.

The first Luddenham Post Office opened on 1 January 1857 and was renamed Bringelly in 1863. The current office opened on 1 March 1872.

Population
In the 2016 Census, there were 1,828 people in Luddenham. 79.4% of people were born in Australia and 76.7% of people only spoke English at home. The most common responses for religion were Catholic 48.7%, Anglican 15.9% and No Religion 11.9%.

Transport

Luddenham has 1 bus service, route 789 between Luddenham & Penrith, operating only twice per weekday, once around 7:30am and once around 4:14pm.

In June 2020, a station at Luddenham on the Western Sydney Airport line due to be completed in 2026, was confirmed.

References

External links
 Twin Creeks
 The Train Shed

Suburbs of Sydney
1857 establishments in Australia
City of Liverpool (New South Wales)
City of Penrith